Robert Joseph Ayala (born July 8, 1969) is an American former professional baseball pitcher for the Cincinnati Reds, Seattle Mariners, Chicago Cubs and Montreal Expos.

Career
Ayala went to high school at Rio Mesa in Oxnard, California. He was brought up with the Reds as a starter before moving to the bullpen in his second season. The Reds traded Ayala with catcher Dan Wilson to the Mariners for Bret Boone and Erik Hanson in November .

Ayala finished the strike-shortened  season with a 2.86 ERA and 71 strikeouts in 57 innings while saving 18 games. He earned a career-high 19 saves during the Mariners' "Refuse to Lose" 1995 season.

On April 24, 1996, Ayala suffered a severe hand laceration trying to open a Chicago hotel window.

The Mariners traded Ayala to the Montreal Expos for minor leaguer Jimmy Turman on April 3, 1999, with Seattle paying all of Ayala's $1.8 million salary that year. Montreal released him a few months later and he finished the season pitching for the Chicago Cubs.

The Minnesota Twins signed Ayala as a free agent, making him a non-roster invitee for the  season. They released him before the start of the regular season.

He started the regular 2000 season pitching for the Triple-A Iowa Cubs, but after starting 1–2 with a 4.61 ERA, was released on May 8.

On May 18, he signed with the Los Angeles Dodgers' Triple-A affiliate, the Albuquerque Dukes. Two months and nine saves later, the Dukes released him.

References

External links

1969 births
Living people
Albuquerque Dukes players
American expatriate baseball players in Canada
Baseball players from California
Cedar Rapids Reds players
Charleston Wheelers players
Chattanooga Lookouts players
Chicago Cubs players
Cincinnati Reds players
Greensboro Hornets players
Gulf Coast Reds players
Indianapolis Indians players
Iowa Cubs players
Major League Baseball pitchers
Montreal Expos players
Port City Roosters players
Seattle Mariners players
People from Ventura, California
Sportspeople from Ventura County, California
Tacoma Rainiers players